The 1928 United States presidential election in Indiana took place on November 6, 1928, as part of the 1928 United States presidential election which was held throughout all contemporary 48 states. Voters chose 15 representatives, or electors to the Electoral College, who voted for president and vice president.

Background
Since the Civil War, partisan alliances in Indiana had been related to history of White settlement, with most of Southern Indiana and German-settled counties voting strongly Democratic, opposed to Yankee-settled Northern Indiana which voted Republican. Some breakdown of these traditional loyalties took place in the 1920s due to German opposition to Woodrow Wilson’s World War I policies, but these occurred to a lesser extent than in other Midwestern states because of the conservative dominance within Indiana’s Democratic Party.

1928, with most other Democrats standing out as they felt the part had no chance of winning due to the prosperous economy, saw New York Governor Al Smith nominated almost by default. Many traditionally Democratic Upland Southerners recoiled at the nomination of Smith because he was a devout Catholic, opposed to Prohibition, and associated with the corruption of the Tammany Hall political machine. Smith’s decision to run with Arkansas Senator Joseph T. Robinson, a “dry” and Protestant, did not alleviate fears of what he would do in the White House.

Ultimate Republican nominee, Secretary of Commerce Herbert Hoover of California, lost the GOP primary in the Hoosier State but was untroubled to win the nomination nationally. The Democratic primary was held very late in the primary season and was won by Smith, who by then had already effective wrapped up the nomination, despite the state originally casting its vote for favorite son Evans Woollen.

In a state whose farmers' were suffering a financial crisis amidst national prosperity due to the loss of demand following the war, the Indiana Farm Bureau would not endorse either ticket. However, Indiana's Senator James E. Watson said that Hoover would carry the state despite these obvious problems.

Vote
After becoming certain to be nominated, it was thought by The Wall Street Journal that Smith would have to carry Indiana to have any chance of winning the Presidency. However, as early as the beginning of July politicos said that prohibitionist and anti-Catholic forces in Indiana gave Smith no chance of carrying the state, despite Smith saying he would enforce the law if elected. At the end of August, pollsters were already suggesting that the latent opposition of the anti-Catholic Ku Klux Klan – which had all but ruled Indiana earlier in the 1920s – and the prohibitionist Anti-Saloon League in rural areas of Indiana would of itself make it impossible for Smith to carry the state.

Hoover visited Indiana late in August as part of the Lake County Fair, focusing on the agricultural crisis and, alongside Iowa Senator Smith W. Brookhart, blaming the Democrats and the Federal Reserve System for the extant farm crisis. Smith did not visit the state during the fall campaign, and polls throughout that season saw the state as safe for Hoover.

Ultimately Hoover carried the state by 20.09 percentage points, which was at the time the best Republican result ever achieved in Indiana, although it was beaten in 1956, 1972, 1984 and 2004.

Results

Results by county

See also
 United States presidential elections in Indiana

References

Indiana
1928
1928 Indiana elections